Shinjō, Shinjo or Shinjou (written: 新條, 新城, 新庄) is a Japanese surname. Notable people with the surname include:

 (born 1973), Japanese footballer
Shinjō Kazuma (born 1951), Japanese science fiction writer
 (born 1951), 9th Dan Okinawan Uechi-Ryū Master, nine-time all-Okinawa Kata and Kumite Champion
 (born 1973), Japanese manga artist
 (1538–1613), Japanese samurai
 (1873–1938), Japanese academic, physicist and astronomer
 (born 1972), Japanese baseball player

Fictional characters
, a character in the anime series SSSS.Gridman

Shinjō (written: 真乗) is also a masculine Japanese given name. Notable people with the name include:

, (1906–1989), Japanese Buddhist

Japanese-language surnames
Japanese masculine given names